Walsall Council, formerly Walsall Metropolitan Borough Council was created in 1974 to administer the newly formed Metropolitan Borough of Walsall.

Walsall Metropolitan Borough Council was assessed by the Audit Commission in 2008 and judged to be "improving well" in providing services for local people. Overall the council was awarded "three star" status meaning it was "performing well" and "consistently above minimum requirements", similar to 46% of all local authorities.

The council offices are located at the Civic Centre in the heart of Walsall. Elections to the council take place in three out of every four years, with one-third of the seats being contested at each election. Between its formation in 1974 and the 2003 election, the council varied between control by the Labour Party, and where no one party had an overall majority. From 2003 to the 2011 election the Conservative Party then held a majority of councillors. However, in 2011 Labour made eight gains, including 5 from the Conservatives and as a result the council came under no overall control, with the Conservatives continuing as a minority administration.

During 2018, the number of councillors held by the Conservative group (30) exactly matches the number held by Labour, the Liberal Democrats and the Independents combined (30). Therefore the re-appointed mayor used his deciding vote in favour of the Conservatives. As of June 2021 the Conservatives have an overall majority of councillors (37 of the 60 seats) and therefore run a majority administration.

Political composition

Electoral wards 

The Metropolitan Borough Council has 60 local councillors representing 20 wards. The wards are:

References

External links 
 Walsall Council

Walsall
Metropolitan district councils of England
Local authorities in the West Midlands (county)
Local education authorities in England
Billing authorities in England
Leader and cabinet executives